Battle of Lyman may refer to:

 Battle of Krasnyi Lyman, 2014
 First Battle of Lyman (2022)
 Second Battle of Lyman (2022)